The following highways are numbered 565:

Canada
 Alberta Highway 565 (former)
 New Brunswick Route 565
 Ontario Highway 565

India
 National Highway 565 (India)

United States